Chiquitania ("Chiquitos" or "Gran Chiquitania") is a region of tropical savannas in the Santa Cruz Department in eastern Bolivia.

Geography
"Chiquitos" is the colonial name for what is now essentially five of the six provinces that make up the Chiquitania, a region in Bolivia's Santa Cruz department. "Chiquitos" refers to a region, not a tribe.

Today, the Chiquitania lies within five provinces of Santa Cruz Department: Ángel Sandoval, Germán Busch, José Miguel de Velasco, Ñuflo de Chávez and Chiquitos province.

Peoples
One of the many tribes inhabiting Chiquitos were the Chiquitano, who still speak the Chiquitano language today.

The name Chiquitos means "little ones" in Spanish. It was chosen by the Spanish conquistadores, when they found the small doors of the Indian huts in the region. Around 20 ethnic groups live in the Chiquitania.

Languages
Languages historically spoken in the Chiquitania included:

Chiquitano
Gorgotoqui (extinct)
Otuke (extinct)
Ayoreo
Guarani

Today, Camba Spanish is the main vernacular lingua franca.

Missions

A notable feature are the 18th-century Jesuit reductions and Franciscan settlements scattered throughout the region. Six churches still remain in the zone and were selected in 1990 as UNESCO World Heritage Sites under the name Jesuit Missions of the Chiquitos.

Ecosystem

The Chiquitano dry forest is the ecosystem which connects South America's two largest biomes, the Amazon and the Gran Chaco, a dense dry forest of thorn-covered trees and scrub that extends south into Paraguay and Brazil. 

Thousands of fires swept through eastern Bolivia in August 2019,(August is the driest month in the region), to the fury of environmentalists and locals who accused the country's president, Evo Morales, of incentivising the blazes after he passed legislation in July that encourages slash-and-burn farming to create pasture and arable land.

See also
 Jesuit Reductions
 List of the Jesuit Missions of Chiquitos
 Beni savanna
 Mamoré–Guaporé linguistic area

References

External links
 La gran Chiquitania: The Last Paradise.

Geography of Bolivia
Tropical and subtropical grasslands, savannas, and shrublands
Regions of South America
Places